Calycomyza verbenae is a species of leaf miner fly in the family Agromyzidae.

References

Further reading

External links

 

Agromyzidae
Articles created by Qbugbot
Insects described in 1951